The black crested mangabey (Lophocebus aterrimus) is a species of primate in the family Cercopithecidae. It is only found in Democratic Republic of the Congo with a small habitat extending to Angola. Its natural habitat is subtropical or tropical dry forests. It is threatened by habitat loss.

References

black crested mangabey
Primates of Africa
Mammals of Angola
Mammals of the Democratic Republic of the Congo
black crested mangabey
Near threatened animals
Vulnerable biota of Africa
black crested mangabey
Taxonomy articles created by Polbot